Bolshevik is a rural locality (a settlement) and the administrative center of Ilyinskoye Rural Settlement, Kolchuginsky District, Vladimir Oblast, Russia. The population was 295 as of 2010. There are 7 streets.

Geography 
Bolshevik is located 15 km north of Kolchugino (the district's administrative centre) by road. Lychevo is the nearest rural locality.

References 

Rural localities in Kolchuginsky District